Gateshead High School may refer to:
Gateshead High School for Boys, previous school on the site of Gateshead Grammar School
Gateshead High School for Girls, previous name of one of the schools which merged to form Newcastle High School for Girls